The Boy with the Arab Strap is the third studio album by Scottish indie pop band Belle & Sebastian, released in 1998 through Jeepster Records.

Recording and production
Stuart Murdoch recalled the recording process for this album felt very different from the previous two. The group spent several months working on it versus the previous albums which were recorded in just a number of days. The music itself was somewhat more experimental as well as more collaborative with some tracks written by Stevie Jackson and Isobel Campbell and more members of the group contributing vocals. Stevie Jackson sings lead on both "Seymour Stein" and "Chickfactor", Stuart David gives a spoken word performance on "A Space Boy Dream", whilst Isobel Campbell sings lead on "Is It Wicked Not to Care?" and duets with Murdoch on "Sleep the Clock Around".

The album's cover photo was taken by Murdoch and shows band member Chris Geddes. The photo was taken as the group spent an afternoon near the River Ayr near Auchencruive.

The inspiration for the album's name came from the band Arab Strap, who are also from Scotland and briefly toured with Belle & Sebastian. An Arab strap is a sexual device for retaining an erection, a fact unknown to Stuart Murdoch at the time. Arab Strap were reportedly less than pleased with their inclusion in the title of the album. When questioned about it, Arab Strap's leader/singer, Aidan Moffat, said "They have a sense of humour." Malcolm Middleton, the band's instrumentalist, added, "Because Arab Strap is quite an interesting name. The words go well together. That's why we chose it as a band name. We're friends with them, but there's a limit to putting someone else's name on an album. They're taking away something from us." He also mentioned that the album had been confused as a collaboration between the bands.

Reception

In October 2011, NME placed the title track at number 130 on its list "150 Best Tracks of the Past 15 Years". The album sold 200,000 units through 2006.

Track listing

Personnel

Belle and Sebastian
 Stuart Murdoch – lead vocals (all except where noted), guitar, keyboard
 Stuart David – bass, spoken word ("A Space Boy Dream")
 Isobel Campbell – cello, lead vocals ("Is it Wicked Not to Care?"), co-lead vocals ("Sleep the Clock Around", "The Rollercoaster Ride"), guitar, percussion, recorder
 Chris Geddes – keyboards, piano
 Richard Colburn – drums
 Stevie Jackson – guitar, lead vocals ("Seymour Stein", "Chickfactor")
 Sarah Martin – violin, keyboard, percussion
 Mick Cooke – trumpet

Additional musicians
 Ian MacKay – bagpipes on "Sleep the Clock Around"
 Neil Robertson – bass on "A Space Boy Dream"
 Gail Anderson, Claire Campbell, Eilidh Campbell, Euan Forrester, David D MacKay and Sarah Wilson – the string section on "A SpaceBoy Dream" and "Dirty Dream Number Two"

Charts

References

1998 albums
Belle and Sebastian albums
Matador Records albums
Albums produced by Tony Doogan
Jeepster Records albums